The Maramba Cultural Museum is a museum in Livingstone, Zambia, dedicated to the preservation of traditional Zambian culture and art.

References
Museums in Zambia

Museums in Zambia
Livingstone, Zambia
Buildings and structures in Southern Province, Zambia
Tourist attractions in Southern Province, Zambia